Thung Saliam is a district (amphoe) of Sukhothai province, in the lower north of Thailand.

Geography
Neighboring districts are (from the north clockwise): Si Satchanalai, Sawankhalok, Si Samrong and Ban Dan Lan Hoi of Sukhothai Province, and Thoen of Lampang province.

History
The minor district (king amphoe) Thung Saliam was established in 1957, when the two tambons Thung Saliam and Klang Dong were split off from Sawankhalok District. It was upgraded to a full district in 1959.

Administration
The district is divided into five sub-districts (tambons), which are further subdivided into 59 villages (mubans). The sub-district municipality (thesaban tambon) Thung Saliam covers parts of tambon Thung Saliam, and Khao Kaeo Si Sombun the entire sub-district of the same name. There are a further four tambon administrative organizations (TAO).

References

External links
amphoe.com (Thai)

Thung Saliam